The 39th Airlift Squadron is a United States Air Force unit based at Dyess Air Force Base, Texas.  The unit flies the Lockheed C-130J Super Hercules. It is primarily tasked to transport cargo and personnel, and where circumstances require, airdrop them. It traces its history to 1942 and fought in the Pacific during the Second World War.

History
The 39th conducted paratroop drops on Noemfoor, Luzon, as well as aerial transport in the Pacific Ocean theater of World War II during World War II.  The squadron participated in the Berlin Airlift in 1948.  It was the squadron that provided disaster relief for the Peruvian earthquake in June 1970 conducting numerous missions to the people of Peru. 
It was part of airlift missions to Grenada, in October 1983, to Panama, December 1989 – January 1990, and to Southwest Asia, August 1990 – March 1991.

Operations
Operation Desert Storm
Operation Southern Watch
Operation Iraqi Freedom
Operation New Dawn
Operation Enduring Freedom

Lineage
 Constituted as the 39th Transport Squadron on 2 February 1942
 Activated on 22 February 1942
 Redesignated 39th Troop Carrier Squadron on 4 July 1942
 Redesignated 39th Troop Carrier Squadron, Heavy, on 21 May 1948
 Inactivated on 14 September 1949
 Redesignated 39th Troop Carrier Squadron, Medium on 3 July 1952
 Activated on 14 July 1952
 Redesignated 39th Troop Carrier Squadron on 1 March 1966
 Redesignated 39th Tactical Airlift Squadron on 1 May 1967
 Inactivated on 31 July 1971
 Activated on 31 August 1971
 Redesignated 39th Airlift Squadron''' on 1 January 1992
 Inactivated on 1 June 1992
 Activated on 1 October 1993

Assignments

 317th Transport Group (later 317th Troop Carrier Group), 22 February 1942 – 14 September 1949
 317th Troop Carrier Group, 14 July 1952
 465th Troop Carrier Wing, 12 March 1957
 317th Troop Carrier Wing, 8 July 1957
 322d Air Division, 25 September 1958
 317 Troop Carrier Wing (later 317 Tactical Airlift Wing), 15 April 1963 – 31 July 1971 (attached to Detachment 1, 322d Air Division, February–May 1965; 513th Tactical Airlift Wing, 13 May–18 July 1968; 7310th Tactical Airlift Wing (15 April–22 July 1969))

 317th Tactical Airlift Wing, 31 August 1971 (attached to 322d Tactical Airlift Wing, 12 December 1973 – 17 February 1974; 513th Tactical Airlift Wing, 9 July–15 September 1974, 12 July – 14 September 1975; 435th Tactical Airlift Wing, 12 April–14 June 1976, 1 October–15 December 1977; 435th Tactical Airlift Group, 4 January–4 March 1977) 
 317th Tactical Airlift Group, 1 October 1978 (attached to 313th Tactical Airlift Group, 5 June–14 August 1979)
 317th Tactical Airlift Wing, 1 April 1980 (attached to 313th Tactical Airlift Group, 8 October–13 December 1980, 3 February–14 April 1982, 4 June–13 August 1983, 1 October–12 December 1984, 2 February–15 April 1986), 3 March–15 May 1987, 3 June–10 August 1988, May–11 July 1991)
 317 Operations Group, 1 January–1 June 1992 (attached to 313th Tactical Airlift Group, 3 April–31 May 1992)
 7th Operations Group, 1 October 1993
 317th Airlift Group, 1 April 1997 – present

Stations

 Duncan Field, Texas, 22 February 1942
 Bowman Field, Kentucky, 9 October 1942
 Lawson Field, Georgia, October 1942
 Laurinburg-Maxton Army Air Base, North Carolina, 2–12 December 1942
 Garbutt Field, Queensland, Australia, 22 January 1942
 Archerfield Airport, Queensland, Australia, 22 February 1942
 Port Moresby Airfield Complex, New Guinea, 28 September 1943
 Finschhafen Airfield, New Guinea, 23 April 1944
 Hollandia Airfield, New Guinea, July 1944
 Leyte, Philippines, 19 November 1944
 Clark Field, Luzon, Philippines, 28 March 1945
 Okinawa, Ryuku Island, 19 August 1945
 Fukuoka Air Base, Japan, 11 November 1945
 Tachikawa Air Base, Japan, 15 January 1946
 Yamoto Air Base, Japan, 17 July 1946
 Carelus Army Air Field, Japan, 6 September 1946
 Tachikawa Air Base, Japan, 16 October 1946 – 21 September 1948
 Wiesbaden Air Base, Germany, 30 September 1948

 RAF Celle, Germany, 23 December 1948 – 14 September 1949
 Rhein-Main Air Base, Germany, Germany, 14 July 1952
 Neubiberg Air Base, Germany, 23 March 1953
 Évreux-Fauville Air Base, France, 24 June 1956 – 20 June 1964
 Lockbourne Air Force Base, Ohio, 20 June 1964 – 31 July 1971
 Deployed to Évreux-Fauville Air Base, France, February–May 1965; RAF Mildenhall, England, 13 May-18 July 1968; Rhein-Main Air Base, Germany (15 April-22 July 1969)
 Pope Air Force Base, North Carolina, 31 August 1971 – 1 June 1992
 Deployed to Rhein-Main Air Base, Germany , 12 December 1973 – 17 February 1974, 12 April–14 June 1976, 1 October–15 December 1977; RAF Mildenhall, England, 12 July–14 September 1975, 4 January–4 March 1977, 5 June–14 August 1979, 8 October–13 December 1980, 3 February–14 April 1982, 4 June–13 August 1983, 1 October–12 December 1984, 2 February–15 April 1986, 3 March–15 May 1987, 3 June–10 August 1988, May–11 July 1991, 3 April–31 May 1992)
 Dyess Air Force Base, Texas, 1 October 1993 – present

Aircraft
 Douglas C-47 Skytrain (1942–1946)
 Curtiss C-46 Commando (1946–1948)
 Douglas C-54 Skymaster (1946–1949)
 Fairchild C-119 Flying Boxcar (1952–1958)
 Lockheed C-130 Hercules (1958–1971, 1971 – Present)

Notes

Bibliography

External links

Military units and formations in Texas
039